Mr. Iglesias is an American sitcom that premiered on Netflix on June 21, 2019. The series stars Gabriel Iglesias who executive produces alongside Kevin Hench, Joe Meloche, and Ron DeBlasio. In August 2019, the series was renewed for a second season which premiered on June 17, 2020. The second part of the second season premiered on December 8, 2020.

In July 2021, the series was canceled after three seasons.

Premise
Mr. Iglesias follows "a good-natured public high school teacher who works at his alma mater. He takes on teaching gifted but misfit kids to not only save them from being "counseled out" by a bully bureaucrat Assistant-Principal, but also to help them unlock their full potential."

Cast and characters

Main

 Gabriel "Fluffy" Iglesias as Gabe Iglesias, a fun-loving and good-natured history teacher at Woodrow Wilson High School in Long Beach, California. He recently quit drinking alcohol at the show's beginning and regularly attends Alcoholics Anonymous meetings. Aside from his friends and students, his greatest loves in life are professional wrestling and his Volkswagen Bus.
 Sherri Shepherd as Paula Madison, the thrice-divorced principal at Wilson High. A former teacher, her record is stated to be very impressive. She is constantly searching for a new sexual partner and has a profile on virtually every dating app.
 Jacob Vargas as Tony Ochoa, the honors history teacher at Wilson High and Gabe's longtime best friend. He has a gambling problem and is attracted to Abby. In his classes, he says he is laid back.
 Maggie Geha as Abby Spencer, the overly-pure and naïve rookie history teacher at Wilson High. She doesn't feel the same way toward Tony as he feels about her. She is religious since she tends to say things about religions (such as saying verses from the Bible, etc.)
 Richard Gant as Ray Hayward, Gabe and Tony's old teacher who still teaches English at Wilson High. He is known for being sassy and has a complicated relationship with his wife, whom he only references when he asks people not to tell her about what he does.
 Cree Cicchino as Marisol Fuentes, Gabe's favorite student, is very smart and always does well in school. She works three jobs in addition to her studies. She develops feelings for Mikey during the school play, and they eventually kiss and become a couple. Gabe and Mr. Hayward have to entice her into applying to Stanford since she has the grades to have a shot at getting in.
 Fabrizio Guido as Mikey Gutierrez, one of Gabe's dimwitted students who has a crush on Marisol; the two eventually kiss during the mid-season two finale and they become a couple.
 Tucker Albrizzi as Walt (season 2; recurring season 1), one of Gabe's less-than-bright students who's into Jamaican culture, especially Reggae and marijuana. Walt's father is a notorious flake.

Recurring

 Oscar Nunez as Carlos Hernandez, Wilson High's assistant-principal. Both the faculty and student body have a low opinion of him, and he frequently butts heads with Gabe. He attempted to kick Gabe's students out of school due to their effect on the school's status in the first season, but he inevitably failed. He reforms in the next season and attempts to teach theatre to students and becomes more likable, though he is still highly socially awkward.
 Coy Stewart as Lorenzo, one of Gabe's students, is Walt's best friend. He is a funny but paranoid conspiracy theorist who constantly worries about government surveillance. Lorenzo begins dating Rita Perez in season 1, and it is revealed in season 2 that she and Lorenzo are still together a year later.
 Gloria Aung as Grace, one of Gabriel's students often described as "weird" who's into hacking. At the beginning of season 1, Grace is so shy that she has to use a text-to-speech program on her computer to talk to anyone except Gabe. With Gabe's help and encouragement, she starts to come out of her shell and be able to talk to people.
 Bentley Green as Rakeem Rozier (season 1), the entitled star running back who recently transferred from Abby's class to Gabe's class at Wilson High. He was originally an arrogant procrastinator due to initially getting limitless time on assignments and was told by Coach Dixon that he should stay close-minded until Gabe encouraged Rakeem to try studying and become better at other things.
 Kathryn Feeney as Katie, a waitress at the DeBlasio's Restaurant and later at Roxanne's, where the teachers hang out outside of work
 Christopher McDonald as Coach Dixon, the dimwitted and obnoxious football coach at Wilson High. He values athletics over academics and has a "slight" alcoholism issue.
 Chris Garcia as  Mr. Gomez, a science teacher at Wilson High
 Jesus Trejo as Mr. Trujillo, another science teacher at Wilson High. He's always seen with Mr. Gomez.
 Brooke Sorenson as Whitney (season 2), a less-than-humble, privileged honors student who joins Mr. Iglesias' class
 Elora Casados as Jackie (season 2), the new guidance counselor and Gabe's new love interest. Casados made her acting debut after serving as the set costumer for the series.

Guest stars

 Megyn Price as Jessica Dobbs, Walt's mother. She is divorced from Walt's father and regularly attends the same Alcoholics Anonymous meeting group that Gabe goes to. She and Gabe have a mutual attraction, but decide not to pursue it until Gabe has reached 1 full year of sobriety, in order to not run the risk of Gabe falling off the wagon.
 Ron Pearson as Jim, the school janitor who can juggle and balance objects on his chin. He wins the school talent show in season one.
 Joel McHale as Danny, Abby's ex-fiancé. It's revealed that he is cheating on her and Abby breaks up with him. In "Oh Boy, Danny", he comes to Long Beach to win back Abby, but she rejects him. At the end of the episode, he announces his intention to finish out his contract in South Dakota and then move permanently to Long Beach to earn back Abby's trust.
 Maria Quezada as Rita Perez, a tough student who has priors and a crush on Lorenzo
 Jo Koy as Bob, a Filipino-American who owns a taco food truck
 Franco Escamilla as Joaquin Fuentes (season 2), Marisol's father who maintains a strained relationship with her due to his estrangement from his family

Episodes

Series overview

Season 1 (2019)

Season 2 (2020)

Production

Development
On April 26, 2018, Netflix announced that it had given the production a series order for a first season consisting of ten episodes. Executive producers were set to include Gabriel Iglesias and Kevin Hench. On August 17, 2018, it was announced that Joe Meloche and Ron DeBlasio were joining the series as executive producers and that Peter Murietta, Luisa Leschin, and Sam Sklavar would serve as co-executive producers. On April 24, 2019, it was announced the series will premiere on June 21, 2019. On August 8, 2019, Netflix renewed the series for a second season of 12 episodes with the first part premiering on June 17, 2020. The second part of the second season premiered on December 8, 2020. On July 2, 2021, Netflix canceled the series after two seasons when Gabriel contracted COVID-19.

Casting
Alongside the initial series order announcement, it was confirmed that Gabriel Iglesias would star in the series. On August 17, 2018, it was announced that Jacob Vargas, Maggie Geha, and Cree Cicchino had been cast as series regulars. In September 2018, it was reported that Richard Gant and Sherri Shepherd had been cast in main roles and that Tucker Albrizzi would appear in a recurring capacity. In October 2018, it was announced that Fabrizio Guido had joined the cast in a series regular role and that Megyn Price and Coy Stewart had been cast as recurring characters. On September 6, 2019, Tucker Albrizzi was promoted to be a series regular for the second season.

Reception
The review aggregation website Rotten Tomatoes provides an 88% approval from 8 reviews and an average rating of 8/10.

References

External links

2019 American television series debuts
2020 American television series endings
2010s American sitcoms
2020s American sitcoms
2010s American high school television series
2020s American high school television series
2010s American workplace comedy television series
2020s American workplace comedy television series
English-language Netflix original programming
Television series about educators
Television shows set in California
Television productions cancelled due to the COVID-19 pandemic